Gymnopilus norfolkensis is a species of mushroom in the Hymenogastraceae family.

See also

List of Gymnopilus species

External links
Gymnopilus norfolkensis at Index Fungorum

norfolkensis
Fungi of North America